The 1986 UK & Ireland Greyhound Racing Year was the 60th year of greyhound racing in the United Kingdom and Ireland.

Roll of honour

Summary
The year was dominated by the two superstar greyhounds Ballyregan Bob and Scurlogue Champ. Ballyregan Bob broke the world record by winning 32 consecutive races. The George Curtis trained greyhound was voted Greyhound of the Year for the second time. He had begun the year by winning seven more consecutive races, three of which were in track record times but a re-occurrence of his wrist injury had left him on 28 wins. This was just three short of the world record held by American greyhound Joe Dump trained by J C Stanley, which was set in 1979. The long-awaited winning re-appearance was on 13 November at Hove followed by wins 30 and 31 at Harringay, breaking yet another track record in the 31st victory that also equalled the world record. On 9 December Ballyregan Bob lined up for the Racing Post Challenge over 695 metres at his home track Hove. He won easily by 9¼ lengths and duly recorded 32 consecutive wins. Curtis and owners Cliff and Jess Kevern retired the champion to stud.

Scurlogue Champ achieved equal stardom by winning a second BBC Television Trophy and continued to amuse crowds with his remarkable running style, that off letting the field gain a significant lead before winning from a seemingly lost position. His career came to an end on 14 August when he finished lame at Nottingham in a 754-metre event and was retired. Ken Peckham's black dog ended with a record of 51 wins from 63 races and 20 track records.

The National Greyhound Racing Club (NGRC) released the annual returns, with totalisator turnover at £66,192,736 and attendances recorded at 3,792,738 from 5247 meetings. Track tote remained at 17.5% and government tote tax at 4%.

Tracks
Northern Sports invested a £1½ million into Oxford Stadium, they had recently profited from a similar venture at sister track Ramsgate. Oxford's investment included a state of the art 250 seated, two-tiered restaurant and a leisure centre. Oxford then brought in two of the leading kennels in the country at the time. Geoff De Mulder returned to the track and Gary Baggs arrived from new sister track Ramsgate. Baggs based at Rosewood kennels was trialling greyhounds ready for Oxford when he received an offer from Walthamstow Racing Manager Tony Smith, an offer he could not refuse. The De Mulder appointment helped Oxford cover the loss of the soon to be English Greyhound Derby winning trainer Arthur Hitch to Slough.  

Powderhall in Edinburgh was another to invest and marked their 60th anniversary with a new £400,000 grandstand but rival track Shawfield in Glasgow was closed by the Greyhound Racing Association (GRA). After negotiations it was sold to Shawfield Greyhound Racing and Leisure Company Ltd and they, in turn, would re-open the track the following year. The Brandon Stadium in Coventry closed for greyhound racing after only eight years trading although the track layout would remain in place and the Eclipse Stakes moved to Nottingham. The Ladbrokes £2½ million grand re-opening of Crayford Stadium took place on 1 September with the emphasis on providing the betting shops with the Bookmakers Afternoon Greyhound Service (BAGS).

News
There were thirty fully licensed tracks, eight permit tracks and 58 independent tracks. Whitwood in Castleford raced for the first time under NGRC rules after switching from independent status. Independent track Halcrow in Gretna was opened by James Norman and sons in June but Cleethorpes closed.

Competitions
Tico completed in the Pall Mall Stakes over 475m at Harringay and mastered his great rival Hot Sauce Yankee when beating him by just under three lengths in 28.45 seconds and later he returned for a Daily Mirror Derby Trial Stakes, which he won by nearly five lengths in 28.44 sec. Tico won the 1986 English Greyhound Derby and then reached the final of the 1986 Irish Greyhound Derby. His significant achievements were slightly overshadowed by the exploits of the two superstars.

A white and blue dog called Mollifrend Lucky won the Scurry Gold Cup when defeating Master Hardy in July and the Laurels at Wimbledon Stadium.  

Savva camp continued their winning ways and produced a brilliant litter, which included Westmead Move, Olivers Wish and Westmead Call. While still a puppy Westmead Move won the Gold Collar at Catford Stadium and then proved to be a bitch of outstanding ability when going on to win the Grand Prix at Walthamstow, where she became the first greyhound to lower a track record set by Ballyregan Bob. Westmead Move went on to win the Midland Oaks at Hall Green as well as the Brighton Belle at Hove.

Principal UK races

	

+Track record

Totalisator returns

The totalisator returns declared to the National Greyhound Racing Club for the year 1986 are listed below.

References 

Greyhound racing in the United Kingdom
Greyhound racing in the Republic of Ireland
UK and Ireland Greyhound Racing Year
UK and Ireland Greyhound Racing Year
UK and Ireland Greyhound Racing Year
UK and Ireland Greyhound Racing Year